Mayank Tehlan (born 11 October 1986) is an Indian cricketer who plays for Delhi. He was born in Delhi. He was brought by Delhi Daredevils for the 2008 Indian Premier League. He has played for India Under-19 cricket team, and was a part of the squad for the 2006 ICC Under-19 Cricket World Cup.

References

1986 births
Delhi Capitals cricketers
Living people
Delhi cricketers
Indian cricketers